Pėdžiai (formerly) is a village in Kėdainiai district municipality, in Kaunas County, in central Lithuania. According to the 2011 census, the village had a population of 80 people. There is a cemetery and a pond.

History
Pėdžiai (as Pedins) has been mentioned the first time by Hermann von Wartberge in 1372, when the village was raided by the Teutonic Order. Later, it have been mentioned in Die Littauischen Wegeberichte.

In the beginning of the 20th century Pedžiai was an okolica (a property of the Noreikiai, Abakevičiai, Paulavičiai, Rimavičiai, Jurevičiai families).

A part of Pėdžiai village was in Jonava District Municipality (Pėdžiai, Jonava).

Demography

Images

References

Villages in Kaunas County
Kėdainiai District Municipality